Turnley may refer to:

David C. Turnley (born 1955), American photographer
John Turnley, Northern Irish Protestant nationalist politician and activist
Peter Turnley, photographer and photojournalist

See also
Bamford v Turnley (1860), important English tort law case concerning nuisance and what it means to be a reasonable user of land